Monck Mason is an Irish surname.  People with the name include:

 Henry Joseph Monck Mason (1778–1858), Irish writer
 Henry Monck-Mason Moore (1887–1964), British colonial governor
 Henry Monck Mason Hackett (1849–1933), Irish clergyman
 John Monck Mason (1726–1809), Irish politician
 Thomas Monck Mason (1803–1889), Irish musician and balloonist
 Monck Mason, fictional character from Edgar Allan Poe's The Balloon-Hoax, loosely based on Thomas